Thomas Hawkes Nash III (born November 13, 1945) is an American lichenologist. His research is about the biology and ecology of lichens, and the effects of air pollution on plants and lichens. He is known as an authority on the family Parmeliaceae. During his long career at the Arizona State University, he helped develop the lichen herbarium into a world-class collection with over 100,000 specimens representing more than 5000 species. In 2010, the year of his retirement, he was awarded the Acharius Medal for lifetime achievements in lichenology, and the following year had a Festschrift published in his honor.

Biography
Nash was born in Arlington, Virginia, in 1945. He received a B.Sc. from Duke University in 1967. It was around this time that he was introduced to lichens by ecologist Larry Bliss; he would later take an advanced undergraduate class on lichens given by William Culberson, and a lichenology summer course given by Mason Hale. Nash later went on to earn an M.Sc. (1969, botany) and Ph.D. (1971, botany and statistics) from Rutgers University, under the supervision of ecologist Murray Fife Buell. His Ph.D. thesis, titled Effect of Effluents from a Zinc Factory on Lichens, was later published in the journal Ecological Monographs.

Shortly after graduation, he accepted an assistant professorship from Arizona State University in Tempe, where he has spent much of his scientific career. He was promoted to associate professor of botany in 1976, and became a full professor with this institution in 1981. He taught courses in ecology, lichenology, statistics, and, on one occasion, bryology. Nash retired from Arizona State University in 2010. For thirty years Nash and his students investigated Southern California's lichen communities and used them as biomonitors of air quality in the Los Angeles air basin. After his retirement, Nash volunteered with the Wisconsin State Herbarium at the University of Wisconsin–Madison.

Nash has developed a collection of over 110,000 lichen samples for the Arizona State University herbarium, for which he was the curator; about 40,000 of these were collected by Nash himself during his nearly four decades at Arizona State University. The collection features about 450 type specimens, and is represented by about 5,500 different species – about one-quarter of the known lichen species in the world. It is among the ten largest collections of lichens in the United States. His research is largely focused on the biology of lichens and the effects of air pollution on plants. He uses an interdisciplinary approach to research, and the topics of his research publications include ecophysiology, ecology, taxonomy, floristics, and biomonitoring. He developed an interest in lichen physiology after working for a while with Otto Ludwig Lange at the University of Würzburg. Nash's interest in taxonomy developed with his work on the flora of the southwestern United States, and he is considered a leading expert in the family Parmeliaceae, particularly the genera Hypotrachyna and Xanthoparmelia.

Major works by Nash include a revision of Xanthoparmelia species in South America, a monograph on Hypotrachyna for the journal Flora Neotropica, and a three-volume set on the lichen flora of the Greater Sonoran Desert. The latter project, funded by the National Science Foundation, was a large collaborative work involving more than 90 scientists from 23 countries. Taking almost 18 years to complete, much of the effort was taken up through numerous field trips to hundreds of localities throughout the region. As a result, this work, which covers almost 2,000 species – about 40% of the lichens known in North America – is considered an "authoritative taxonomic treatment" that "profoundly increased the understanding of the lichen biodiversity of the Sonoran Desert and surrounding environs". These collecting expeditions resulted in the discovery of about 175 species new to science.

In 2008, Nash was the chair of the organizing committee for the sixth International Lichenological Symposium, which was held at the Asilomar Conference Grounds in Monterey, California. As of 2011, Nash had mentored 30 graduate students (19 Ph.D. and 11 Masters), and authored or co-authored more than 200 peer-reviewed scientific publications.

Personal
Thomas Nash is married to Corinna Gries, who is a professional in biodiversity informatics. She was a researcher  in the Long Term Ecological Research Network in Arizona, and later at the University of Wisconsin.

Memberships and awards
Nash was secretary of the International Association for Lichenology in the years 1971–1977, and the president of the American Bryological and Lichenological Society from 1981 to 1983. He was an associate editor for the scientific journal Bibliotheca Lichenologica from 1996 to 2008, and a member of several scientific societies: the American Institute of Biological Sciences, the Ecological Society of America, the Organization for Tropical Studies, and Sigma Xi.

Nash has been a Fulbright scholar, a fellow of the Arizona-Nevada Academy of Science, and thrice an Alexander von Humboldt fellow.

Recognition
In 2010, Nash was awarded the Acharius Medal for lifetime achievements in lichenology. In 2011, he was honored with a Festschrift in the journal Bibliotheca Lichenologica. This volume, published on the occasion on his 65th birthday, contains 33 articles written by 70 authors.

Eponymy

There are many lichen species that have been named in honor of Thomas Nash. These include:

Xanthoparmelia nashii ; Tephromela nashii ; Lecanactis nashii ; Physcia nashii ; Usnea nashii ; Evicentia nashii ; Harpidium nashii ; Caloplaca nashii ; Cladonia nashii ; Plectocarpon nashii ; Toninia nashii ; Fusicladium nashicola ; Gyalectidium nashii ; Phaeophyscia nashii ; Buellia nashii ; Fellhanera nashii ; Lecanora nashii ; Lecidella nashiana ; Sticta nashii ; Aspicilia nashii ; Tremella nashii ; Acarospora nashii ; Buellia tomnashiana ; Caloplaca tomnashii ; Bulbothrix thomasiana ; Niebla nashii ; Canoparmelia nashii ; Punctelia nashii ; Lobariella nashii . The genus Trinathotrema  (family Stictidaceae) also honors Nash; it is constructed from parts of his name: tho from Thomas, na from Nash and tri referring to III. Tomnashia  (family Teloschistaceae) is another generic eponym.

Selected publications
A comprehensive list of Nash's publication from the period 1971 to 2010 is given in Bates and colleagues' 2011 Festschrift. Some representative publications include:

Books

 (reprinted in 2008)

Articles

See also
 :Category:Taxa named by Thomas Hawkes Nash III

References

Cited literature

1945 births
Acharius Medal recipients
American lichenologists
American taxonomists
Arizona State University faculty
Rutgers University alumni
Duke University alumni
People from Arlington County, Virginia
American botanists
Living people